Off-Beat is a 1960 album by American jazz vocalist June Christy, arranged and conducted by Pete Rugolo.

The tracks on the album were included on a 1997 double-CD re-issue under the title The Song Is June!

Critical reception
AllMusic wrote that "Pete Rugolo's typically unusual and surprising arrangements inspire the singer and make this a fairly memorable (if not famous) outing." Jazz Times, in a review of the album's reissue, wrote that "despite their vocal limitations, these performances are hauntingly expressive mementos of an artist who never gave less than her all, and is fondly remembered by a host of devotees."

Track listing
 “Remind Me” (Jerome Kern, Dorothy Fields)
 “Out of This World” (Harold Arlen, Johnny Mercer)
 “You Wear Love So Well” (George Handy, Jack Segal)
 “Off Beat” (Leon Pober)
 “The Bad and the Beautiful” (David Raksin, Dory Langdon)
 “Who Cares About April?” (Ken Hanna, Hank Levy)
 “You Say You Care” (Jule Styne, Leo Robin)
 “Out of the Shadows” (Pete Rugolo, Bobby Troup)
 “A Sleepin' Bee” (Harold Arlen, Truman Capote)
 “Somewhere (If Not in Heaven)” (Kenny Burrell)

Personnel
Tracks 3, 5, 6, 8 and 10
 June Christy - vocals
 woodwinds including Bud Shank - also saxophone, flute
 Bob Cooper - tenor saxophone, oboe
 Larry Bunker - vibraphone
 Pete Rugolo - arranger, conductor
 string quartet

Recorded Capitol Tower, Hollywood, California, August 8, 1960

Tracks 1, 2, 4, 7 and 9
 June Christy - vocals
 trumpets including Don Fagerquist
 trombones including Frank Rosolino
 French horns
 woodwinds including Bud Shank - alto saxophone, flute
 Bob Cooper - tenor saxophone, oboe
 Joe Castro - piano
 Pete Rugolo - arranger, conductor

Recorded Capitol Tower, Hollywood, California, 19 August 1960

References

External links
  
 

June Christy albums
Albums arranged by Pete Rugolo
1960 albums
Albums recorded at Capitol Studios